The Ṇamōkāra mantra or Navkar Mantra is the most significant mantra in Jainism, and one of the oldest mantras in continuous practice.  This is the first prayer recited by the Jains while meditating. The mantra is also variously referred to as the Pancha Namaskāra Mantra, Namaskāra Mantra, Navakāra Mantra, Namaskāra Mangala or Paramesthi Mantra.

Below is the meaning of Namokar Mantra line by line, wherein the devotee first bows to the five supreme souls or Pañca-Parameṣṭhi:

Arihant— Those who have destroyed the four inimical karmas
Siddha — The persons who have achieved "Siddhi" 
Acharyas — The teachers who teach how to behave / live one's life ( Acharya = one who teaches Aacharan ) 
Upadhyaya — Preceptor of less advanced ascetics
Sādhu — The monks or sages in the world practicing Samyak Charitra (right conduct)
The practitioner also says that by bowing to all these five supreme souls,
All of his or her karmas can get destroyed and
Wishes for well-being of each and every living entity
The practitioner finally says that this mantra is the most auspicious one

There is no mention of any particular names of the gods or any specific person. The prayer is done towards the guṇa (the good qualities) of the gods, teachers and the saints. Jains do not ask for any favors or material benefits from the tirthankaras or monastics. This mantra simply serves as a gesture of deep respect towards beings whom they believe are spiritually evolved, as well as to remind the people of their ultimate goal i.e. moksha (liberation).
The Navkar Mantra consists of 68 letters. It is "gunavaachak" mantra & not a "naamvaachak" mantra.

History

In Kushana and Shaka periods of 1st century CE to the first quarter of 2nd century, only the first line was prevalent. The rest of the lines are not there. It was inscribed by the Jain monarch Kharavela of Kalinga kingdom. According to historian M. A. Dhaky, these two lines were originally used as mangala (auspicious opening lines) in written works and rituals then. The Namaskara Mantra with all Pañca-Parameṣṭhi (five supreme souls) was first mentioned in the auspicious opening lines in the condensed edition of Vyākhyāprajñapti. This version also replaces Ardhamagadhi  with Maharashtrian Prakrit .
Shatkandagam (circa 475-525 CE) and later Visheshavashyakbhashyavritti (circa 725 CE) and Anuyogadwarasuchi shows  (Namo) replaced with more Prakit  (Namo). Composed around the beginning of the Common Era, Chattarimangalam Stotra mentions only Arhat, Siddha, Sadhu and Kevalipragnapti Dharma (Dharma as prescribed by Omniscients) as four chief auspicious. So the three lines regarding Acharya, Upadhyaya and Sadhu must have been added later. The last four lines about phala-prashashti (benefits of chanting) are not older than 6th century CE and are not found in any older works, according to Dhaky. The importance of it as a mantra in texts, traditions, rituals and meditation arose thereafter.

The Ṇamōkāra/Navkar Mantra

Abbreviations

Meditation 

According to Dravyasaṃgraha, a major Jain text:

See also
 Siddhachakra
God in Jainism
 Bhaktamara Stotra
Jain meditation

References

Sources 
 

 

Jain mantras
Jain texts